Gerald Arthur Greider (August 30, 1923 – March 20, 1982) was an American Republican politician from Wisconsin.

Born in Greenville, Illinois, Greider was educated in the public schools in La Crosse, Wisconsin. Greider was a businessman and served on the La Crosse Common Council 1966–1968. Greider was vice president and secretary of a bakery in La Crosse. In 1972, he moved to Mason City, Iowa, where he died. Greider served in the Wisconsin State Assembly from 1969 to 1971.

Notes

People from Greenville, Illinois
People from Mason City, Iowa
Politicians from La Crosse, Wisconsin
Wisconsin city council members
Republican Party members of the Wisconsin State Assembly
1923 births
1982 deaths
20th-century American politicians